SAWS may refer to:

Peace be upon him (Islam), abbreviated as SAWS, phrase that Muslims often say after saying the name of a prophet of Islam
The San Antonio Water System, a municipally-owned water utility in the city of San Antonio, United States.  
State Administration of Work Safety, government agency of the People's Republic of China

See also
 Saus, Catalonia, Spain
 SAW (disambiguation)